Aasma was an Indian pop group that formed in 2003, and has disbanded since. The band was composed of the winners of the second season of Indian version of the international television talent show Popstars, named Coke [V] Popstars, after its principal sponsors, Coca-Cola and music channel Channel [V].

The six original members were Neeti Mohan, Jimmy Felix, Sangeet Haldipur, Aamir Ali, Peyush Dixit, and Vasudha Sharma . They launched their second and last album Remix - which was used for a generation-x tv series on StarOne, going by the same name- in 2004.

Though there has been no official report about the group's split, they have not released an album since 2004, and the members have all embarked on solo careers.

Neeti Mohan has been the most successful one. She made her singing debut in Bollywood in 2012, with "Ishq Wala Love" in Student of the Year opposite Shekhar Ravjiani and Salim Merchant. Mohan ended the year 2012 with "Jiya Re" from Jab Tak Hai Jaan. Both her songs earned her various nominations and also some awards at the various awards function. She also featured on the TV show, MTV Unplugged (India) along with Shalmali Kholgade and Arijit Singh among many where she sang an acoustic version of "Jiya Re". She had also featured on the same show with A. R. Rahman earlier.

Neeti has also appeared as one of the judges/coaches of "The Voice" ,along with Shekhar and Shaan, which was telecasted at "&TV" every Saturday-Sunday at 9:00 p.m. IST.

See also 

 Viva (band)

References 

Indian pop music groups
Popstars winners
Indian girl groups
21st-century Indian women singers
21st-century Indian singers